Alexander Nicolaas Voormolen (3 March 1895 in Rotterdam – 12 November 1980 in Leidschendam) was a Dutch composer.

Education
He was born as the son of Rotterdam chief of police Willem Voormolen and studied piano with Willem and Marinus Petri and composition with Johan Wagenaar at the Toonkunst Musical Academy in Utrecht. His classmates included Willem Pijper and Jacob van Domselaer. He went to Paris in 1915 at the invitation of conductor Rhené-Bâton, where he studied with Albert Roussel and met Maurice Ravel and Frederick Delius, among others.

Activities
He returned to the Netherlands in 1923 to live in The Hague. For a long time, he was a music reviewer at the Nieuwe Rotterdamsche Courant and librarian of the Royal Conservatory of The Hague.

Compositions
Voormolen was initially mainly influenced by French impressionism. Later, more Dutch influences were noticeable, for instance in his compositions Tableaux des Pays-Bas, two "children's books" (1920 and 1924), both Baron Hop suites (1924 and 1931, inspired by 18th-century court life in The Hague) and the Pastorale for oboe and string orchestra (1940). Voormolen was an admirer of Louis Couperus. He composed a number of orchestral works inspired by Couperus, such as Eline (1957) and the Kleine Haagse suite (1939). The Canzone from the oboe concert was used as a tune for Dutch TV show De kleine zielen, based on Couperus' novel. Finally, the influence of Max Reger and Anton Bruckner can be heard in later works, such as the Sinfonia Concertante (1951) and the Ciacona e fuga (1958).

He dedicated his Manchmal geschieht es in tiefer Nacht (poem by Rainer Maria Rilke) to Lien Korter.

Awards and honors
In 1932, Voormolen received the Muziekprijs ("Music Prize") from the municipality of The Hague for his Air Willem V. In 1961, he received the Johan Wagenaarprijs for his entire oeuvre, and the Visser Neerlandiaprijs for Three songs on British verse (1948). In 1976, he received the Penning van de Rotte from the municipality of Rotterdam. In 1978, he was awarded the honorary membership of the Haagse Kunstkring.

References
Biography (in Dutch)
Alexander Voormolen at the Donemus website (in Dutch)
Biography in the Biografisch Woordenboek van Nederland (in Dutch)

External links
Archive collection at the Netherlands Music Institute

CD of works by Voormolen  published by Chandos Records

Musicians from Rotterdam
1895 births
1980 deaths
20th-century classical composers
Dutch male classical composers
Dutch classical composers
20th-century Dutch male musicians